Maly Dubovsky is a rural locality (a khutor) in Deminskoye Rural Settlement, Novoanninsky District, Volgograd Oblast, Russia. The population was 33 as of 2010.

Geography 
Maly Dubovsky is located in steppe on the Khopyorsko-Buzulukskaya Plain, 45 km northwest of Novoanninsky (the district's administrative centre) by road. Deminsky is the nearest rural locality.

References 

Rural localities in Novoanninsky District